Anne La Berge (born Palo Alto, California, in 1955) is a flutist, composer and improviser, currently residing in Amsterdam. Her performances bring together a virtuosic command of her instrument, use of microtonal textures and melodies, and an array of percussive flute effects, all combined with electronic processing. These have distinguished her as “a pioneer in a wide array of new techniques”. Many of her compositions involve her own participation, though she has produced works intended solely for other performers, usually involving guided improvisation and electronics. She is known for her use of texts that form part of her compositions and improvisations. In addition to creating her own work, she regularly performs in other artists’ projects in a range of settings from modern chamber music to improvised electronic music.

While pursuing PhD research at the University of California, San Diego in the mid-1980s she formed a duo with flutist John Fonville, commissioning new works and exploring extended techniques on flute, particularly with regard to microtonal scales. She moved to Amsterdam in 1989, where she has lived ever since.

In 1999, together Steve Heather and Cor Fuhler, she founded Kraakgeluiden, a improvisation series based in Amsterdam, exploring combinations of acoustic instruments, electronic instruments and computers, and using real-time interactive performance systems. Many of the musical collaborations that have resulted have taken on a life beyond the Kraakgeluiden series, which ceased in 2006. La Berge’s own music has evolved in parallel, and the flute has become only one element in a sound world that includes samples, synthesis, the use of spoken text and electronic processing.

In 2006 - 2007 she collaborated with Dr. David LaBerge. This is a performance work based on Dr. La Berge's apical dendrite theory using film, narrative voice samples and music.

She performs on a set of quarter tone (Kingma system) flutes and regularly uses the Kyma (sound design language) System for audio synthesis and processing.

She can be heard on the New World Records, Z6 Records, Largo, Artifact, Etcetera, Hat Art, Frog Peak, Einstein, X-OR, Unsounds, Canal Street, Rambo, esc.rec., Data, chmafu, Carrier, verz, Splendor and Relative Pitch Records labels which include recordings as a soloist and with Lukas Simonis, Ensemble Modern, United Noise Toys, Fonville/La Berge duo, Rasp/Hasp, Bievre/La Berge duo, Apricot My Lady, the Corkestra, MAZE, Joe Williamson, Ig Henneman, Jaimie Branch, Phil Maguire and Ted Moore.

She is an active artist in Splendor Amsterdam, a collective of 50 musicians, composers and stage artists who have transformed an old bathhouse in the center of Amsterdam into a cultural mecca.

Anne La Berge has regularly received funding from the Dutch Funds for Composers, the Funds for the Podium Arts and the Amsterdam Funds for the Arts. She is the co-director, with her husband David Dramm, of the Volsap Foundation. She also works as a freelance coach for the Amsterdam based Executive Performance Training company.

Discography (as composer) 

 bruit Carrier Records 056 2020. Flute and electronics with Ted Moore.
 two cities verz 2020. Electro acoustic duos by Phil Maguire and Anne La Berge.
 Dropping Stuff and Other Folk Songs Relative Pitch Records RPR1094. Free improv with Ig Henneman and Jaimie Branch.
 Modern Genetics Splendor Records 001. A triple LP with works by Dramm, La Berge and La Berge Dramm.
 three cities verz 2019. Electro acoustic duos by Phil Maguire and Anne La Berge.
 Damn chmafu nocords 2018. A compilation of women composers. Includes Utter by Anne La Berge.
 RAW LP Unsounds 2017. With MAZE.
 The Hum Unsounds 2015. With Joe Williamson.
 SPEAK  New World Records 2011. Works featuring Cor Fuhler, Stephie Buttrich, Misha Myers, Josh Geffin, Amy Walker, Patrick Ozzard-Low and Anne La Berge.
 Rust Fungus Z6 Records 2010. With Lukas Simonis
 Newly Refurbished and Tussock Moth esc.rec., 2009. songs by Apricot My Lady including Adam and Jonathan Bohman and Lukas Simonis.
 rasp/hasp Ramboy #19, 2004. Improvisations with Jody Gilbert, Wilbert de Joode, Richard Barrett, Paul Lovens
 VerQuer Upala Records, 2004. Includes rough diamond.
 Radio WORM WORMrec, 2004.
 Kraakgeluiden, 2003. unsounds 06.
 Flute Moments with Theresa Beaman 1998. Laurel Records 857. Includes revamper.
 United Noise Toys live in Utrecht '98. X-OR, 1998. With Gert-Jan Prins. Features duct; yolk; nape; lurk; flap; juke; moat; pike; turf.
 Blow. Frog Peak Music, 1994. Features never again; rollin'; [sic]sauce; indeed; unengraced; revamper.

Sources

Further reading 
 Gilmore, Bob. Interview with Anne La Berge. Paris Transatlantic Magazine, November 2005.
 Metzelaar, Helen.  Women and 'Kraakgeluiden': the participation of women improvisers in the Dutch electronic music scene (2004) in Organised Sound, 2004, vol. 9, no. 2: 199-206.
 La Berge, Anne. Composer/performers in the Netherlands: the nuts and bolts, 2010.
 Interview with Anne La Berge by Steve Ricks, 2019.
 Peer, Rene van. Interview with Anne La Berge Gonzo Circus #145, 2018.
 Vear, Craig. The Digital Score Routledge 2019. 
 Madsen, Pamela. The Collaborative Process of Re-creation: Anne La Berge's Brokenheart for Performers, Live Electronics and Video. Puckette, Miller and Hagan, Kerry L., Between the Tracks MIT Press 2019.

External links 
 AnneLaBerge.com
 Volsap
 SplendorAmsterdam
 MAZE
 Executive Performance Training

1955 births
American women composers
21st-century American composers
Living people
Microtonal musicians
American women in electronic music
American flautists
21st-century American women musicians
American expatriates in the Netherlands
21st-century women composers
21st-century flautists